The Ultimate Soldier was produced by the company known as 21st Century Toys. It was founded in 1997, and began making 1/6 scale figures and uniforms, and now mostly makes 1/6 scale weapon sets as well as 1/18 and 1/32 scale toys. The action figures are based on World War Two, Vietnam War, Korean War, and Operation Desert Storm soldiers.

History
In 1997, 21st Century Toys decided to create a "12" inch soldier with more detailed accessories than Hasbro's G.I. Joe. 21st Century Toys Ultimate Soldier early packaging utilized the art of Illustrator designer Malcom West. As the line became more popular with collectors, West became the overall packaging art director and brought in Creative Resolutions, a firm in Oakland California owned by Michelle Fie. The company decided to create a separate box design catered to each figure, using graphic treatments tailored to the figure. These independent designs were created and handled by lead designer Jeff Blosch. Well established illustrator Marc Ericksen, a combat veteran of two years served in Viet Nam, and having created box art for nearly 100 video games, was contracted to create the illustrations for eighteen of the figures covering World War II, Viet Nam, the current Middle East actions, and Law Enforcement. The packaging featured an exciting full battle scene, along with design motifs  from the theater of action relative to the figure. This attention to detail drove the desire of collectors and created strong sales of the figures. The combat figures included: For WWII: U.S. 101st Airborne Pathfinder, British 8th Army Bren Gunner, U.S. First Infantry Bazooka gunner, German Das Afrika Korps Infantryman, German Infantry Officer, Monte Cassino, U.S. Marine Raider, Pacific Theater, U.S. Tank Commander  N.C.O. Battle of the Bulge, German Wehrmacht Machine gunner, U.S. Marine Medic, Japanese Infantryman, Pacific Theater, German Fallschurmjager Gran Sasso raid. For Vietnam: U.S. Special Forces Mike Force officer, Viet Cong Cadre rifleman, North Vietnamese infantryman, U.S. Navy SEAL recon. For Middle East/ Iraq: British S.A.S. Scud Hunter. For Afghanistan: Russian Spetznatz Infantryman, Russian Spetznatz Sniper. For Law Enforcement: Police Sniper, Police Helicopter Pilot, Police K-nine officer and German Shepherd.
The original SAM action figures released featured the same basic movable joint design as the G.I. Joe Classic Collection action figures featuring 15 movable parts. They were slightly taller with a slimmer build, and made with flexible plastic. The hands were a main concern, because they were stiff and difficult to place accessories into, as well as having an unrealistic head sculpt with a baby-face-like design. 
In 1999, the company released the Super Soldier body design with 27 movable parts. The expanded line included three new categories: The original Ultimate Soldier line included a Vietnam Veterans Memorial set of The Three Soldiers, a Spetsnaz soldier and sniper, a Navy SEAL, George S. Patton, Erwin Rommel  and various other modern day soldiers. The America's Finest line included Steve McQueen, firefighters, and a K-9 police officer. 

The Villains line included Boris; a KGB enforcer agent, a bounty Hunter named T-Gore, and a biker. The Misfits line included Jerry Only and Doyle Wolfgang Von Frankenstein from the band the Misfits. A United States Secret Service agent was being considered when it was mentioned in a fan club] news letter; unfortunately this led to an unknown rival toy company producing it before 21st Century toys made their final decision about releasing it. This basic design was used in 2000 to create the Cy Girls known as the Perfect Body Female .

The arms had four parts, featuring forearms, elbow pieces, lower biceps joints, and upper biceps/shoulder joints. The legs also had four parts with movable hips, calves, thighs and knee caps. The torso consisted of a movable chestpiece, abdomen and a pelvic piece connected by screws and springs. The head consisted of a pivoting neck joint (also connected by a spring and screw) with a universal socket joint for the rubber molded head to connect to. The new head sculpt was much more realistic. The double-jointed elbows and knees enabled the arms and legs to be posed into folded positions. 

This action figure could be posed into the lotus position and any other position that the human body was capable of (and several it was not capable of). The two main concerns were the following: the flap sections on the calves and thigh connecting to the knee caps would have gaps in between them, and the connecting joints created a loose fit.  The pivot joint connecting the neck to the torso was also very loose fitting, so that if it were accidentally knocked out of place or removed, there was no known way to put it back on. The accessories, web gear, helmets backpacks, and weapons, were created in great detail, and the clothing, headgear, and accoutrements were accurately researched; camouflage patterns and fatigue colors were faithfully created. 

In 2014 the Ultimate Soldier XD brand has been reintroduced. The new products are toy building sets of military aircraft. 

Action figures
Playscale figures
Horror punk